Ma Thudamasari is a novel by Moe Moe (Inya).

Ma Thudamasari may also refer to:
 Ma Thudamasari (film), the novel's film adaptation.